Björn Westerberg (10 February 1945 – 15 April 2014) was a Swedish football manager. He was Djurgårdens IF manager in 1985–86.

References

Swedish football managers
Åtvidabergs FF managers
IFK Göteborg managers
Djurgårdens IF Fotboll managers
1945 births
2014 deaths
Place of birth missing